Caenepolis or Kainepolis, also called Caene or Kaine (Καινή), was a town of ancient Laconia north of the Cape Taenarum. It is probably the same town as mentioned by Strabo under the corrupt form Cinaedium or Kinaidion (Κιναίδιον). It contained a temple of Demeter and another of Aphrodite, the latter near the sea. 

The modern village of Kyparissos stands on the site of this town. Some ancient remains and inscriptions of the time of the Antonines and their successors have been found here. On the door-posts of a small ruined church are two inscribed quadrangular στῆλαι, decorated with mouldings above and below. One of the inscriptions is a decree of the Taenarians, and the other is by the community of the Eleuthero-Lacones (τὸ κοινὸν τῶν Ἐλευθερολακώνων). We have the testimony of Pausanias that Caenepolis was one of the Eleuthero-Laconian cities; and it would appear from the above-mentioned inscription that the maritime Laconians, when they were delivered from the Spartan yoke, formed a confederation and founded as their capital a city in the neighbourhood of the revered sanctuary of Poseidon. The place was called the New Town (Caenepolis); probably as a successor settlement to Taenarum.

References

Populated places in ancient Laconia
Former populated places in Greece
Ancient Greek archaeological sites in Greece